Mauro Ramiro Milano (born 18 January 1984 in Buenos Aires) is an Argentinean football midfielder and striker.

Career 
Milano made his debut in Argentina's Primera División as a player for Club Atlético Huracán. He was later transferred to Asteras Tripolis of Super League Greece. After two years in Tripoli, he accepted an offer from Iraklis Thessaloniki F.C. He signed a two-year contract with Iraklis Thessaloniki F.C. on July 6, 2009.

References

External links
 Mauro Milano at BDFA.com.ar 
 
 

1984 births
Living people
Argentine footballers
Club Atlético Huracán footballers
Asteras Tripolis F.C. players
Iraklis Thessaloniki F.C. players
Querétaro F.C. footballers
All Boys footballers
Argentine Primera División players
Primera Nacional players
Super League Greece players
Bolivian Primera División players
Argentine expatriate footballers
Expatriate footballers in Greece
Argentine expatriate sportspeople in Greece
Expatriate footballers in Bolivia
Argentine expatriate sportspeople in Bolivia
Footballers from Buenos Aires
Association football midfielders